HafenCity is a quarter in the borough of Hamburg-Mitte, Hamburg, Germany, Europe. It is located on the Elbe river island Grasbrook, on the former Port of Hamburg area. It was formally established in 2008 and also includes the historical Speicherstadt area, which since 2015 is an UNESCO World Heritage Site with the adjacent Kontorhausviertel. The main landmark of the HafenCity is the Elbphilharmonie concert hall.

In a narrower sense, HafenCity Hamburg is a project of urban regeneration where the "Grosser Grasbrook" area of the former Hamburg free port is being revitalised with new hotels, shops, office buildings, and residential areas. The project is considered the largest urban redevelopment project in Europe by landmass (approximately ). With the decreased economic importance of free ports in an era of European Union free trade, large container ships, and increased border security, the Hamburg free port was reduced in size, relieving the current HafenCity area of its restrictions. The ground-breaking ceremony was held on 20 June 2001, with the first quarter called "Am Dalmannkai/Sandtorkai" -next to the Elbphilharmonie- completed in 2009.

When completely developed, the HafenCity area hopefully  will be home to about 12,000 people and the workplace of 40,000 people.

Demarcation

On 1 March 2008, HafenCity was declared to be a separate district through the Law Concerning the Spatial Division of the Free and Hanseatic City of Hamburg (Gesetz über die räumliche Gliederung der Freien und Hansestadt Hamburg) - RäumGlG. It is composed of the former harbor of Großen Grasbrooks as well as the warehouse district on the islands of Kehrwieder and Wandrahm. Together, this borders the districts of Altstadt, Rothenburgsort, and the former district of Klostertor.

On 20 February 2007, a decree of the Senate established the exact border delineation of both parts of the new district. Just over four years earlier, on 1 January 2003, the area was removed from the duty-free zone of Hamburg to allow construction of housing and associated infrastructure.

Speicherstadt
Because of the new division, the Speicherstadt (Warehouse District) now belongs to the administrative region of the northern part of HafenCity instead of part of the Altstadt. However, the term HafenCity is primarily used to refer to the area of city development, whereas Speicherstadt is seen as a separate quarter.

History

The land of the former island of Grasbrook, upon which the HafenCity is built, lay until the beginning of the 19th century outside of the city gates. The city fortifications used to run along what is now the street of Am Sandtorkai. The residential areas of Kehrwieder and Wandrahm were inside the walls, in the area of the current HafenCity. Outside the city walls, the boggy areas were used as meadows, and the western end of Große Grasbrook was used a place for executions, including those of pirates Klaus Störtebeker and the Victual Brothers. In the 18th and early 19th centuries, shipyards and port businesses operated here. In 1844, the first gasworks in Hamburg were built on the northern part of the island.

When the capacity of the Binnenhafen (de) and Niederhafen (de) ports became full at the end of the 19th century, the city walls were demolished and the area of Grasbrook was used to extend the harbor area. In 1868, the first artificial dock was constructed at Sandtorhafen, and in 1881, the Grasbrookhafen was added. The Strandhafen was built directly on the Norderelbe, the Magdeburger Hafen, Brooktorhafen, and Ericusgraben were made to connect to the Oberhafen, and, finally, the Baakenhafen was built with a rail connection to the Hamburger Elbbrücken (de) bridges and the Kirchenpauerhafen with anchorage on the Elbe. Until 1886, the entire island was built up with docks and port installations. In 1872, the Hamburg Hanover railway station (de) was constructed on Lohseplatz east of the Magdeburger Hafen. The Kehrwieder and Wandrahm residential quarters were demolished in 1883 to allow construction of the customs and duty-free zone of the Port of Hamburg, displacing around 20,000 residents. In 1888, the Warehouse District (Speicherstadt) could then be built in this area. Kaispeicher B was built in 1878 and the administration building of the old port authority (Altes Hafenamt) was built in 1885 at the Magdeburger Hafen. Around the start of the 20th century, the first heated fruit storehouses were constructed, and in 1928, a refrigerated herring warehouse designed by Fritz Schumacher was built.

Culture and Education
 The city of Hamburg has built a new concert hall on top of an old warehouse, called the Elbphilharmonie. It is a new landmark for the city, but has been plagued by vast cost overruns and its construction was about six years behind schedule. It was opened on 11 January 2017.

The area is served by the Katharinenschule, an elementary school. It is the home of HafenCity University, a new school focusing on architecture and urban planning.

Politics
These are the results of HafenCity in the Hamburg state election:

Economy
The area is currently home to the German headquarters of Kühne & Nagel, an international shipping conglomerate, the Spiegel Group's new headquarters on the Ericusspitze, and Unilever.  Greenpeace opened its new headquarters in Hafencity in 2011. The Hamburg-America Center opened its doors in 2009.

Transport and Infrastructure
The Honorary Consulate of the Kyrgyz Republic (Kyrgyzstan) established in Hamburg in 1995 is located at Am Sandtorkai 77. At Strandkai, cruise ships can berth at Hamburg Cruise Center HafenCity.

The area is served by a newly constructed underground line, the U4, which was completed in 2012. The line features two new stations: Überseequartier and Hafencity University.

Flood Protection Innovations
Because HafenCity is subject to periodic flooding from storm surges, using innovative flood protection technologies has been an important part of its redevelopment. The threat from flooding is even more grave due to the predicted effects of climate change. While dikes were initially considered to shield the islands from storm surges, it would have been impossibly expensive and taken away from the view. Buildings along the shore remain at their original level but must be waterproofed up to the elevated-road level. In addition, shore-adjacent buildings are required to have an entryway allowing access to the -high road level so that they remain accessible during times of flooding. Although the design has been expensive, it has been recognized as one of the more innovative flood protection innovations in use today.

See also

 Port of Hamburg
 Internationales Maritimes Museum Hamburg

References

Bibliography
Act of the areal organisation, 6 July 2006 Gesetz über die räumliche Gliederung der Freien und Hansestadt Hamburg (RäumGlG)

External links

 HafenCity (English selectable)

Quarters of Hamburg
Redeveloped ports and waterfronts in Germany
Urban planning in Germany
Mixed-use developments in Germany
Tourist attractions in Hamburg
Hamburg-Mitte
Buildings and structures under construction in Germany